Individual event for squash at the 2019 Southeast Asian Games was held in Manila Polo Club, Makati, Philippines  from 1 to 3 December 2019.

Schedule

Results

Men's singles

Women's singles

References

Individual